General elections were held in the Federation of Bosnia and Herzegovina on 12 October 2014 as part of the Bosnian general elections. Voters elected the 98 members of the House of Representatives of the Federation of Bosnia and Herzegovina and the assemblies of the cantons of the Federation of Bosnia and Herzegovina.

Results

House of Representatives

Assemblies of the Cantons

Aftermath
Four months after the elections, Marinko Čavara (HDZ) was elected president. Six months after the elections, Fadil Novalić (SDA) was elected prime minister, heading a coalition of the SDA, HDZ, and DF.

See also
2014 Bosnian general election
2014 Republika Srpska general election

References

Elections in Bosnia and Herzegovina
Federation of Bosnia and Herzegovina
2014 elections in Europe